Sven Klang (22 September 1894 – 26 February 1958) was a Swedish footballer. He played in one match for the Sweden national football team in 1921. He was also part of Sweden's squad for the football tournament at the 1920 Summer Olympics, but he did not play in any matches.

References

1894 births
1958 deaths
Swedish footballers
Sweden international footballers
Place of birth missing
Association football goalkeepers